Billy Boyce (7 May 1927 – 24 May 2011) was an Australian boxer. He competed in the men's welterweight event at the 1948 Summer Olympics. He died on 24 May 2011, seventeen days after his 84th birthday.

References

1927 births
2011 deaths
Australian male boxers
Olympic boxers of Australia
Boxers at the 1948 Summer Olympics
Place of birth missing
Welterweight boxers